Billy Bob Buttons (born 25 September 1970) the pen name of Edward Hugh Trayer, is a British-born children, young adult and adult novelist. He is the author of sixteen books to date including: Felicity Brady and the Wizard's Bookshop (Galibrath's Will, Articulus Quest, Incantus Gothmog, Glumweedy's Devil and Crowl's Creepers), The Gullfoss LegendsTor Assassin Hunter, Tor Wolf Rising, Tiffany Sparrow and I Think I Murdered Miss. He is published by The Wishing Shelf Press.

In 2011, Felicity Brady and the Wizard's Bookshop was longlisted for the International Rubery Book Award, and Tor Assassin Hunter was a runner up in the 2012 UK People's Book Prize. In 2014, I Think I Murdered Miss won the UK People's Book Prize. The award was presented to Billy Bob Buttons at a ceremony in London.

His picture book The Boy Who Piddled in His Grandad's Slippers was produced as an animated short film in 2018. A film of I Think I Murdered Miss is presently in pre-production with a release date of Summer 2020.

He visits over to 200 UK primary schools every year delivering literacy workshops; it is estimated he has met with over 250,000 children over the last six years. He is also the founder and organiser of The Wishing Shelf Independent Book Awards.

He is also the author of two books for adults written under the pen name Hickory Crowl: Tor Assassin Hunter, Book 1: Wolf Rising and a murder/mystery entitled Bewitcher.

Born in Yorkshire, Trayer has a wife, Therese Råsbäck, and three children.

References

External links
 Brady and the Wizard's Bookshop
 The Wishing Shelf Independent Book Awards

 
 
 

British children's writers
1970 births
Living people